|}

This is a list of electoral district results of the 1936 Western Australian election.

Results by Electoral district

Albany

Avon

Beverley

Boulder

Brown Hill-Ivanhoe

Bunbury

Canning 

! colspan="6" style="text-align:left;" |After distribution of preferences

 Preferences were not distributed to completion.

Claremont

Collie

East Perth

Forrest

Fremantle

Gascoyne

Geraldton

Greenough 

 Preferences were not distributed.

Guildford-Midland

Hannans

Irwin-Moore

Kalgoorlie

Kanowna

Katanning

Kimberley

Leederville

Maylands

Middle Swan

Mount Hawthorn

Mount Magnet

Mount Marshall

Murchison

Murray-Wellington

Nedlands

Nelson

North Perth

North-East Fremantle

Northam

Perth 

 Preferences were not distributed.

Pilbara

Pingelly

Roebourne

South Fremantle

Subiaco

Sussex 

 Preferences were not distributed.

Swan

Toodyay

Victoria Park

Wagin

West Perth

Williams-Narrogin

Yilgarn-Coolgardie

York

See also 

 1936 Western Australian state election
 Members of the Western Australian Legislative Assembly, 1936–1939

References 

Results of Western Australian elections
1936 elections in Australia